Molly S. McGlennen is an American poet and scholar of Anishinaabe and European descent. She is an associate professor of English and Native American studies at Vassar College. She is currently the vice president of the Association for the Study of American Indian Literatures. Her book Creative Alliances: The Transnational Designs of Indigenous Women’s Poetry was winner of the Beatrice Medicine Award for Outstanding Scholarship in American Indian Studies.

McGlennen was born in Minneapolis, Minnesota. She holds a PhD in Native American studies from UC Davis and an MFA in creative writing from Mills College.

Published works

Books

Creative Alliances: The Transnational Designs of Indigenous Women’s Poetry (University of Oklahoma Press, 2014).
Fried Fish and Flour Biscuits (Salt Publishing, 2010).

Work in anthologies
Our Lives Are Made of Recipes in Native Voices: Indigenous American Poetry, Craft and Conversation, Eds. Dean Rader and C. Marie Fuhrman, Tupelo Press, 2019
Snake River IV in Ghost Fishing: An Anthology of Eco-Justice Poetry, Ed. Melissa Tucky, University of Georgia Press, 2017
Composition in Tending the Fire, Ed. Chris Felver, University of New Mexico Press, 2017
Snake River III and “Snake River IV,” Red Ink, Spring 2015
Bonfire I “Bonfire III,” and “Bonfire IV,” Yellow Medicine Review, Spring 2014
Snake River V As/Us: A Space for Women of the World, Issue 3, 2014
Snake River II and “Bonfire II,” Yellow Medicine Review, Spring 2012
Snake River I Natural Bridge Literary Journal, No. 26, Fall 2011
Interwoven Sing: Poetry from the Indigenous Americas (Sun Tracks): University of Arizona Press, Allison Adelle Hedge Coke (Editor), Nov. 2011
Three Poems for Ellia Sentence, Jan. 2010

References

Living people
Vassar College faculty
University of California, Davis alumni
Native American academics
Native American women academics
American women academics
Native American poets
21st-century American poets
Native American women writers
Year of birth missing (living people)
21st-century American women writers